The Monster (also Hayoola) is an Iranian TV series in the genre of political satire, directed by Mehran Modiri, produced by Seyed Mostafa Ahmadi and Mehran Modiri and written by Amir Baradaran. The designer and director of the script of this series is Peyman Ghasemkhani. This is the seventh series between Modiri and Ghasemkhani and it is also the first series of this director in which Siamak Ansari is not present. The filming of the first season started in December 2016 and lasted until May 2017. Due to the fact that the series took place in different places, the location of the filming was not fixed. The first season of this series started broadcasting on May 30, 2019, and ended on September 16, 2019. The second season is also in production. The first season of the series aired on a weekly basis on Mondays.

Storyline
Houshang is a simple and honorable teacher who is satisfied with his life and has little regard for the world, but inadvertently finds himself on a path that changes his life and enters the process of embezzlement and corruption. He is unexpectedly inflated with wealth and distances himself from his former character. The story is narrated in several periods from Qajar to the present day.

Cast

 = Main

 = Recurring (+4)

 = Guest (3-1)

Awards

References

External links
 

Iranian television series
Islamic Republic of Iran Broadcasting original programming
2010s Iranian television series
Persian-language television shows